The Batson River is a  river in the town of Kennebunkport in the U.S. state of Maine.  It flows into the west end of Goosefare Bay, an arm of the Atlantic Ocean, north of the village of Cape Porpoise.

See also
List of rivers of Maine

References

Maine Streamflow Data from the USGS
Maine Watershed Data From Environmental Protection Agency

Rivers of York County, Maine
Rivers of Maine